The International Climbing and Mountaineering Federation, commonly known by its French name Union Internationale des Associations d'Alpinisme (UIAA, lit. International Union of Alpine Clubs), was founded in August 1932 in Chamonix, France when 20 mountaineering associations met for an alpine congress. Count Charles Egmond d’Arcis, from Switzerland, was chosen as the first president and it was decided by the founding members that the UIAA would be an international federation which would be in charge of the "study and solution of all problems regarding mountaineering". The UIAA Safety Label was created in 1960 and was internationally approved in 1965 and currently (2015) has a global presence on five continents with 86 member associations in 62 countries representing over 3 million people.

After the 2022 Russian invasion of Ukraine, the UIAA suspended all UIAA officials from Russia, and delegates from the Russian Mountaineering Federation (RMF) and Russian officials and athletes were excluded from all UIAA-sanctioned activities and events.

Role 

The UIAA is today the international governing body of climbing and mountaineering and represents climbers and mountaineers around the world on a wide range of issues related to mountain safety, sustainability and competition sport.

The International Climbers’ Meet, the goal of these meets is to foster good will and cultural understanding through our shared passion of climbing by hosting a diverse group of climbing abilities from a multitude of countries.

Safety 
The UIAA Safety Commission develops and maintains safety standards for climbing equipment. These standards are implemented worldwide by the manufacturers who also participate in annual Safety Commission meetings. The Commission works with nearly 60 manufacturers worldwide and has 1,861 products certified.

Dynamic Rope UIAA fall count rating
The test to determine the fall count uses a 5.1m rope and drops a weight (80 kg single rope / 55 kg double rope) so that it falls 4.8m before experiencing a reaction force from the rope. This means that the weight is falling below the fixed end and there is minimal rope to stretch and absorb the force. The fall count rating is the number of times the rope can undergo this test before breaking. For the dynamic rope to be UIAA certified it requires a fall count rating of 5 or more.

This number does not indicate that the rope needs to be discarded after this many falls while climbing, since a fall would usually not have the climber fall beyond the belayer and there is usually more rope to stretch and absorb the fall. There has been no recorded accidents of a UIAA certified dynamic rope breaking without there being damage from a sharp edge or chemical.

Mountain Medicine Diploma
Together with the International Society of Mountain Medicine (ISMM) and the International Commission for Alpine Rescue (ICAR), the UIAA Medical Commission has established and developed a joint Diploma in Mountain Medicine that establishes minimal requirements for courses in mountain medicine in August 1997 (Interlaken, Switzerland). Many course organizers adopted these standards and the Diploma in Mountain Medicine (DiMM) has become a widely respected qualification.

The Medical Commission was founded in 1981. Its history dates back to an earlier time when there were only a few doctors representing the largest mountaineering federations. The commission has grown to include 22 delegated doctors from 18 different mountaineering  federations, as well as 16 corresponding members from all over the world. The UIAA Medical Commission has worked very closely with the Medical Commission of the International Commission for Alpine Rescue (ICAR). The current presidents of the UIAA Medical commission and the MedCom ICAR are always on the advisory board of the ISMM.

Competitions 

The UIAA is the world governing body for ice climbing competitions. The annual World Cup circuit and the bi annual World Championship and Youth World Championship are organised on different continents with athletes from over 30 countries participating.

Ice climbing
The UIAA is the world governing body for ice climbing competitions. The annual UIAA Ice Climbing World Cup circuit and the bi annual World Championship and Youth World Championship are organized in different continents with athletes from over 30 countries participating.

There are two ice climbing disciplines, Speed and Lead. In Speed, athletes race up an ice face for the best time. In Lead competitions the climbers' ability to master a difficult route in a given time is tested.

Anti-Doping Commission
The UIAA has adopted the World Anti-Doping Code (2014); this includes the mandatory articles of the Code and all relevant International Standards. The commission also oversees the anti-doping testing of athletes who participate in UIAA ice climbing competitions.

Global Youth Summit
The Global Youth Summit is a series of UIAA youth events where young mountaineers from around the world come together to climb, promote peace and cooperation between countries and work on the protection of the environment. First implemented ten years ago, it consists of a series of expeditions and camps offered by UIAA member federations to other UIAA member federations and their members.

All UIAA Global Youth Summit events are organised and undertaken in strict accordance with the relevant Federation's regulations and UIAA Youth Commission Handbook & UIAA Youth Commission criteria and recommendations governing such events. Once approved the National Federation or event organiser and their designated leaders have responsibility for the event. The UIAA Youth Commission and UIAA Office may on occasion appoint other responsible persons such as trainers, event organisers and partners.

Safety Label holders 
Source:

 Alpidex
 Alien Cams
 Austrialpin
 Arcteryx
 Beal
 Beste
 Big Wall
 Black Diamond
 Black Safe
 Blue Water Ropes 
 Camp
 Cassin
 Cilao
 Cousin-Trestec
 Conquista
 Climbing Technology
 DMM
 Edelweiss
 Edelrid
 EKS
 Faders
 FIXE
 Fusion
 Gaetani
 Gilmonte
 Gipfel
 Gleisein
 GM Climbing
 GrandWall
 Grivel
 Haftgohar
 Ice Rock
 Kailas
 Kong
 Lyon
 Mad Rock
 Mammut
 Metolius
 Millet
 Misty Mountain
 Nal Hon
 New England Ropes
 Ocun
 Omega Pacific
 Peguet
 Petzl
 PMI
 Ravina
 Raumer
 Roca
 Rock Exotica
 Ropenet
 SMC
 Salewa
 Schweiger Fulpmes
 Simond
 Singing Rock
 Skylotec
 Southern Ropes
 Sterling
 Stubai
 Tapecraft
 Tendon
 Usang
 Vento
 Waves
 Xinda

Presidents 
 1932–1964: Count Charles Egmond d'Arcis
 1964–1968: Edouard Wyss-Dunant
 1968–1972: Albert Eggler
 1972–1976: Jean Juge
 1976–1984: Pierre Bossus
 1984–1990: Carlo Sganzini
 1990–1995: Pietro Segantini
 1995–2004: Ian McNaught-Davis
 2004–2005: Alan Blackshaw
 2005–2011: Mike Mortimer
 2012–2020: Frits Vrijlandt
 2020–present: Peter Muir

Source:

Members

References

External links

 UIAA official website

1932 establishments in France
Climbing organizations
International sports bodies based in Switzerland
Alpinisme
Organisations based in Bern
Sport in Bern
Sports organizations established in 1932